The Mint 400 is an annual American desert off-road race which takes place in Las Vegas, Nevada. It was resumed in 2008 after a 20-year hiatus.

The race was for both motorcycles, until 1977, and four-wheel vehicles (buggies, cars and trucks) sponsored by Del Webb's Mint Hotel and Casino. Del Webb, a real estate developer and friend of Howard Hughes, was owner of the Mint Hotel in downtown Las Vegas. It became known as The Great American Desert Race.

History

Norm Johnson created "The Mint '400' Del Webb Desert Rally" in 1968 in his role as promotions director of The Mint Hotel & Casino.
 
The future of the Mint 400 race came into question in 1988 following the sale of Del Webb's Mint Hotel & Casino to Jack Binion, owner of the Horseshoe Club. However, as a testament to the race itself, the prestige and importance of the event created by veteran race director K.J. Howe and the Mint management team and the financial benefit this promotion brought to the City of Las Vegas, under new ownership the annual Mint 400 Off Road Race continued to be run in 1988 and 1989. 

New owner Binion felt the race and its ancillary activities along Fremont Street had a negative impact on his casinos.  So, the race was no longer held after the 1989 Mint 400.

The Mint was not held for nearly twenty years, then was restarted by long-time sponsor General Tire with help from the Southern Nevada Off-Road Enthusiasts. The race resumed on March 29, 2008.  The race was preceded by inspections of the vehicles on Fremont Street in the Fremont East district. SNORE eventually sold the franchise to The Martelli Brothers for the 2011 edition.

In 2012, the Martelli Brothers partnered with off-road industry veteran Casey Folks, owner of the largest off-road desert racing organization in the world, the Best in the Desert Racing Association. The Mint was added to the Best in the Desert championship schedule, and a new  race loop was carved out for the  contest. The number of entries swelled to an astounding three hundred and twenty three race teams, making the Mint 400 one of the largest off-road races in the world.

2012 also saw the introduction of the Method Race Wheels Pit Crew Challenge, an event in which sixteen pit crews from the top unlimited truck teams competed in a head-to-head battle to decide who had the best crew. Each of the three-man teams were given one jack, one impact gun, and one spare tire. The team who completed two tire changes the fastest, advanced to the next round. Over 10,000 spectators on Fremont Street, showed up to cheer on the teams.  After several close and heated rounds the General Tire/THR team – which included drivers Mikey Childress, Rick Johnson, and crewmember James Walker – out-pitted the field to win.

The Martelli Brothers parted ways with Best in the Desert for the 2020 edition.

Winners

Motorcycle
1970 Drino Miller & Vic Wilson 9:54:5
1971 Max Switzer & J.N. Roberts 9:54:5

2019 Ricky Brabec & Kendall Norman 4:53:27
2022 Dalton Shirey & David Kamo 8:00:21

Overall four-wheel
1968 Gene Hirst & Al Halz 16:01:32
1969 John Johnson & Linda Johnson 12:19:00
1970 Drino Miller & Vic Wilson 12:44:34
1971 Fritz Kroyer & Bill Harkey 13:30:42
1972 Fritz Kroyer & Bill Harkey 8:33:00
1973 Parnelli Jones & Bill Stroppe 9:10:00
1974 No race due to gas crisis
1975 Gene Hirst & Rick Mears 9:31:46
1976 Gene Hirst & Bobby Ferro 10:22:47
1977 Malcolm Smith & Bud Feldkamp 9:09.30
1978 Malcolm Smith & Bud Feldkamp 8:59.35
1979 Bobby Ferro & Glenn Harris 8:34.94
1980 Jack Johnson 7:38.37
1981 Ron Gardner & Bernie Mayer 8:18:13
1982 Jim Temple & Rolf Tibblin 9:32:39
1983 Jim Wright & Billy Wright 9:17:52
1984 Jim Wright & Billy Wright 9:20:31
1985 Jim Temple & Kenny Cox 9:08:16
1986 Larry Ragland 8:33:14
1987 Steve Sourapas & Dave Richardson 8:50:00
1988 Mark McMillin 7:46:16
1989 Ivan Stewart 9:34:40
1990–1994 Nissan 400 
1995–2007 No race held
2008 Brian Collins & Chuck Hovey 6:36:55
2009 Andy McMillin 8:27:35
2010 Roger Norman 8:37:29
2011 BJ Baldwin 8:30:37
2012 Robby Gordon 6:05:54
2013 Bryce Menzies 6:19:59
2014 Steve Sourapas & Andy McMillin 6:14:29
2015 Justin Lofton 5:57:38
2016 Justin Lofton 5:36:10
2017 Rob MacCachren 5:30:32
2018 Bryce Menzies & Jake Povey 5:52:03
2019 Justin Lofton 5:24:26
2020 Luke McMillin &  Jason Duncan 6:49:52
2021 Rob MacCachren & Cayden MacCachren 6:56:21
2022 Kyle Jergensen & Shawn Shanks 6:43:49

Truck
 1971 Fritz Kroyer, Bill Harkey 13:30:42

Classes 
 Heavy Metal
 Mini Metal
 Stock Bug
 Stock Full
Unlimited Truck
 CLASS 1
 CLASS 1/2-1600
 CLASS 3
 CLASS 4
 CLASS 5
 CLASS 5-1600
 CLASS 6
 CLASS 7
 CLASS 7S
 CLASS 8
 CLASS 9
 CLASS 10
 CLASS 12
 CLASS 13
 CLASS 15
 CLASS 18
 CLASS 1450
 Ultra4 4400

Notable entrants
Entrants in this event were worldwide and included some well-known names from racing and people from the television and motion picture industry. Indianapolis 500 winners Parnelli Jones, Al Unser, Rick Mears, and Rodger Ward; off-road champions Mickey Thompson, Ivan Stewart, Jack Flannery, Walker Evans; international off-road competitor, Rod Hall; power boat champion Bill Muncey, film and television stars James Garner, Steve McQueen, Larry Wilcox and Patrick Dempsey; comedian Mort Sahl; astronaut Gordon Cooper and rock musician Ted Nugent have competed in the Mint 400. Jay Leno raced with Jerry Zaiden from Camburg Racing, Heavy D & Diesel Dave from the Discovery Channel show.  Diesel Brothers competed in the Mint 400 in 2017. Heavy D & Diesel Dave's race in the Mint 400 was featured on the show in the episode from Season 3, "Race Against the Machine".

Mint 400 girls
K.J. Howe, Mint Hotel executive and longtime Mint 400 Race Director, conceived "The Girls of the Mint 400" in 1972 to add glamor and PR value to the race. Each year the Mint racing committee chose a contingent of women to reign over the events' activities. Local media representatives would help select the final ten from the hundreds of entries received from contestants from around the US, Canada, Mexico and Europe. The Mint racing committee would select the final five who became the Mint 400 girls. Former mint 400 girls include actress Lynda Carter and Wheel of Fortune's Vanna White. Mint 400 Girls Tracy Vaccaro and Dona Speir were later Playboy centerfolds and Vickie Reigle was on the Playboy cover subsequent to her Mint 400 publicity. Lisa Soulé, Anita Merritt, Angela Aames, Lisa Hunter and Suzanne Regard later appeared in various movies and television series as well as Mint Hotel and Casino advertising campaigns.

The Miss Mint contest  was revived along with the race with the goal to become the premiere beauty contest in motorsports. In 2012 the prize purses were increased dramatically, driving up the number of entrants to nearly double from previous years. The contingent of off-road women competed for a combination of online votes and judges’ votes. After an online contest with online voting – the competition was narrowed down to three women. Vanessa Golub-Ferrara was picked as The 2012 General Tire Miss Mint.

In popular culture
Hunter S. Thompson's novel Fear and Loathing in Las Vegas depicts the 1971 race in one of the earliest and best known instances of gonzo journalism. The race is also featured in the 1998 film, Fear and Loathing in Las Vegas based on Thompson's book.

The 2010 and 2011 Mint 400 were featured on Fuel TV, while the 2012 Mint 400 was aired on Speed.

References

External links
 
 2010 Mint 400 Trailer
 2011 Mint 400 Trailer
 2012 Mint 400 Trailer

Motorsport in Las Vegas
Rally raid races
Motorcycle races
Recurring sporting events established in 1967
1967 establishments in Nevada
Annual sporting events in the United States